Pedro Bobadilla Escobar (25 April 1865, Villeta – 21 April 1942) was Vice President of Paraguay under Eduardo Schaerer from 1912 to 1916. He had previously been Minister of Worship, Justice, and Public Education as well as being a Superior Court Judge. He had initially been educated in the Church at a seminary and was born in Villeta.

References 

1865 births
1942 deaths
People from Villeta
Paraguayan people of Spanish descent
Liberal Party (Paraguay) politicians
Vice presidents of Paraguay
Government ministers of Paraguay
Presidents of the Senate of Paraguay